Edmondia is a genus of plants in the family Asteraceae, endemic to the Fynbos shrublands in the Cape Province area of South Africa.

 Species
 Edmondia fasciculata (Andrews) Hilliard	
 Edmondia pinifolia (Lam.) Hilliard
 Edmondia sesamoides (L.) Hilliard

References

Gnaphalieae
Asteraceae genera
Endemic flora of South Africa